Tara Mahmood is a Pakistani actress and singer. She rose to prominence by playing supporting roles in high-rated films, Seedlings (2012) and Good Morning Karachi (2013). Her performance in drama serials Muhabbat Subha Ka Sitara Hai (2014) and  Diyar-e-Dil (2015) earned her a wide spread acclaim. Tara joined the band Rushk in 2014 after five years long hiatus as its lead vocalist replacing Nazia Zuberi. She has played a role of Masooma in Hum TV's acclaim Ramzan series Suno Chanda and its sequel Suno Chanda 2. She, alongside her sister Beenish Mehmood are the daughters of veteran politician, Shafqat Mehmood, the former Federal Minister of Education and National Heritage.

Filmography

Film

Television
{| class="wikitable"
|-
! Year!!Title!!Role!! Notes
|-
|2006
|Inspector Khoji
|Tara
|
|-
| 2014 || Muhabbat Subha Ka Sitara Hai  ||Nabeel's Sister in Law|| 
|-
| 2014 || Goya || || 
|-
| 2014 ||Soteli|| ||
|-
| 2015 || Jackson Heights || || 
|-
| 2015 || Diyar-e-Dil  ||Zuhra Tajamul || 
|-
| 2017 || Nazr-e-Bad  ||Shaista || 
|-
| 2017 ||Laut Ke Chalay Aana ||Aqeela || 
|-
| 2017–2018 ||Teri Raza ||Rameez's mother|| 
|-
| 2018 || Suno Chanda  || Masooma ||
|-
|2018
|Ek Chance Pyaar Ka
|Naina's mother
|Telefilm
|-
|2018|| Seep||Fakhra||
|-
|2018||Romeo Weds Heer ||Arshad ||
|-
| 2019 || Anaa ||Nazia || 
|-
| 2019 || Juda Na Hona ||Sudais Mother
|
|-
| 2019 ||Suno Chanda 2  || Masooma ||
|-
|| 2019–2020|| Deewar-e-Shab ||Shaama||
|-
|| 2020 || Raaz-e-Ulfat || Munaza ||
|- 
|| 2020–2021|| Bharaas|| Sasha's mother in law |||
|-
|| 2020–2021 || Dunk || Mrs. Anjum|| 
|-
| 2021 || Chupke Chupke || Kaneez|| 
|-
|2021
|Mujhay Vida Kar|Khalida
|
|-
|2021
|Amanat|Salma
|
|-
|rowspan="2" | 2021–2022
|Dil-e-Momin|Seema
| 
|-
|Mere Humsafar|Sofia
|
|-
|rowspan="2"|2022
|Wabaal|Rahat
|
|-
|Wehem|Sabahat
|
|}

 Web series 

Discography
Singles
 "Mera Naam" "Tujhay Patta To Chalay" "Bori" "Aye Na"''

References

External links
 
 

Living people
Pakistani female models
Pakistani women singers
Pakistani television actresses
21st-century Pakistani actresses
1982 births